Jamie Campbell (born May 20, 1967) is a Canadian sportscaster with Sportsnet. He is currently the host of Toronto Blue Jays telecasts and previously provided the play-by-play from 2005 to 2009.

Youth and education
Born and raised in Oakville, Ontario, Campbell attended many Oakville Blades hockey games where his father was the public address announcer.

His love of baseball began in 1977 when his father took him to a game, sparked by a conversation with Lyman Bostock of the Minnesota Twins. Bostock was murdered a year later in Gary, Indiana. As a youth, Campbell regularly attended Blue Jays games.

Campbell also idolized Canadian Formula One driver Gilles Villeneuve and later named one of his sons after him.

Campbell played Little League baseball at Wallace Park in Oakville. He attended Oakville Trafalgar High School where, as a member of the football team, he was a teammate and friend of future National Football League placekicker Steve Christie. In 1986, he went to Ryerson Polytechnical Institute from which he graduated with a Bachelor in Applied Arts in Radio and Television in 1989.

Early career
At age 20, Campbell got a job as librarian and runner for the Hockey Night in Canada archives where he worked with Don Cherry and Ron MacLean. In 1993 Campbell worked as a sportscaster for the Canadian Broadcasting Corporation in Edmonton, Alberta. From 1997–1998, he worked with CJOH-TV in Ottawa, Ontario.

In 1998, Campbell was offered a job as an anchor with new cable network CTV Sportsnet (now Rogers Sportsnet) with whom he has remained ever since. He and Daren Millard hosted the station's first show, Sportscentral (later called Sportsnet Connected, now known as Sportsnet Central). As well as anchoring Sportsnet's news shows Campbell reported from a variety of events such as the Super Bowl and the Olympics. He gained play-by-play experience covering Canadian Football League and Arena Football League games. He also served as the station's in-studio host for Blue Jays broadcasts and Major League Baseball playoffs.

Toronto Blue Jays
Campbell's first game providing play-by-play coverage for the Blue Jays was on April 8, 2002, covering for Rob Faulds after the death of his father forced him to miss a game. In 2005, he took over as the play-by-play voice of the Blue Jays for Sportsnet, replacing Faulds after the death of color commentator John Cerutti. In December 2009, Campbell was replaced by former Blue Jays commentator Buck Martinez. In 2010, Campbell became host of the newly-created pre-game show Blue Jays Central alongside former Blue Jay catcher Gregg Zaun. He now hosts the show with Joe Siddall due to Zaun's termination by Sportsnet in 2017.

His signature home run call was "You can kiss that one goodbye!", which was previously used by former broadcaster Fergie Olver while he was calling Blue Jay games during the 1980s.

Olympics
As part of the Canadian Olympic Broadcast Media Consortium, Campbell was selected to be play-by-play announcer for the events held at Cypress Mountain during the 2010 Vancouver Olympics, with Canadian former stars such as snowboarder Tara Teigen and mogulist Veronica Brenner.

Campbell called Canada's first gold medal on home soil which was won by Alexandre Bilodeau in the men's moguls, to which he called "And Alex Bilodeau... has done it! He has done it! He has done it! Gold medal for Alex Bilodeau! Oh relax Canada, you can breathe easy now, this great country finally has Olympic gold right here at home!"

Campbell also worked as the main play-by-play announcer for the cycling events at the 2012 Summer Olympics in London.

Miscellaneous
At the 2004 Major League Baseball All-Star Game, Campbell caught the home run hit by David Ortiz, to whom he returned the ball.

As a fan, Campbell has attended many memorable Blue Jays moments including Otto Vélez's four home runs in the Jays' double header on May 4, 1980; Devon White's catch in game 3 of the 1992 World Series and Dave Winfield's throw that killed a seagull on August 4, 1983.

In 2008, Campbell was the emcee for the Canadian Baseball Hall of Fame Induction Ceremony, during which Tony Fernández, Billy Harris, Gladwyn Scott and Peter Widdrington were inducted.

Personal
Campbell currently lives in Toronto with his two sons. In March 2022 he announced on Twitter that he had been diagnosed with chronic lymphocytic leukaemia 14 months earlier, and was receiving treatment.

References

1967 births
Living people
People from Oakville, Ontario
Canadian television sportscasters
Major League Baseball broadcasters
Toronto Blue Jays announcers
Canadian Football League announcers
Toronto Metropolitan University alumni
Cycling announcers
Olympic Games broadcasters
Arena football announcers